Russicada presentday Skikda, was the Mediterranean port city serving Cirta, the capital of the Kingdom of Numidia in Ancient Algeria. 

It overlooked the straits between Sicily (Europe) and Numidia (Africa), a place of significant relevance in geopolitical strategies at the time. Russicada was mentioned by the medieval chronicler Geoffrey of Monmouth in his pseudo-historical accounts of the mythical kings of Britain and their deeds as "Rusicada" — a Latin spelling easily confused with the moth genus Rusicada.

See also

Kingdom of Numidia
Former populated places in Algeria